Abdulaziz bin Saud Al Rashid (born 1915) was the son of Lulwa Al-Salih Al-Sabhan and Rashidi Emir Saud bin Abdulaziz Al Rashid. He is notable for being the father of poet Talal Al-Rasheed.

References

1916 births
House of Rashid
Sons of monarchs
Date of death unknown